Edward Lamson Henry (January 12, 1841May 9, 1919), commonly known as E.L. Henry, was an American genre painter, born in Charleston, South Carolina.

Early life
Though born in Charleston, by age seven his parents had died and Henry moved  to live with cousins in New York City.  He began studying painting, there and at the Pennsylvania Academy of Fine Arts in Philadelphia.  In 1860 he went to Paris, where he studied with Charles Gleyre and Gustave Courbet, at roughly the same time as Claude Monet, Pierre-Auguste Renoir, Frédéric Bazille, and Alfred Sisley.

In 1862, he returned to the United States, where he served as a clerk on a Union transport ship in the American Civil War.  After the war he resumed his painting, with many works inspired by his experiences in the war.  He moved into the prestigious Tenth Street Studio Building in Greenwich Village, where Winslow Homer also had a studio.  In 1869, Henry was elected to the National Academy of Design, New York.

He died at his home in Ellenville, New York on May 9, 1919.

Painting

As a painter of colonial and early American themes and incidents of rural life, he displays a quaint humor. He was best known for themes involving transportation, especially railroads, but also stage coach and canal boat journeys, among other means, all rendered in minute detail.

Henry was a member of the New-York Historical Society. Because of his great attention to detail, his paintings were treated by contemporaries as authentic historical reconstructions.  In 1884, Henry and his wife Frances Livingston Wells moved to the town of Cragsmoor in the Shawangunk Mountains of Upstate New York where they helped to found an artists' colony.  Henry acquired a large collection of antiques, old photos, and assorted Americana, from which he researched his paintings.  His wife Frances said that "Nothing annoyed him more than to see a wheel, a bit of architecture etc. carelessly drawn or out of keeping with the time it was supposed to portray".

Henry's "historical fictions" often portrayed an idyllic and agrarian America, one relatively unperturbed by Civil War or by the growing phenomena of industrialization, urbanization and immigration that were taking place during the period in which he painted.

Henry's paintings were extremely popular throughout his life. Art professor William T. Oedel wrote of his legacy, "Perhaps no artist played so consistently and so durably to the American cult of nostalgia in the last quarter of the 19th century as Edward Lamson Henry."

Gallery

References

External links

American paintings & historical prints from the Middendorf collection, an exhibition catalog from The Metropolitan Museum of Art (fully available online as PDF), which contains material on Henry (no. 44)
Gallery
 Also see Valerie Ann Leeds, "Railroad Ties: Edward Lamson Henry, The 9:45 a.m. Accommodation in Context and the Commission by John Taylor Johnston," Nineteenth Century 41(Fall 2021): 10-25.

1841 births
1919 deaths
19th-century American painters
American male painters
20th-century American painters
American genre painters
Pennsylvania Academy of the Fine Arts alumni
National Academy of Design members
Artists from Charleston, South Carolina
Painters from South Carolina
Painters from New York City
19th-century American male artists
20th-century American male artists